The Swiss Records in swimming are the fastest times ever swum by an individual from Switzerland. These records are maintained by Switzerland's national swimming federation: Schweizerischer Schwimmverband.

The federation recognizes/tracks records for both long course (50m) and short course (25m) pools, in the following events (by stroke):
freestyle: 50, 100, 200, 400, 800, 1500, and (50m only) 5000 .
backstroke: 50, 100 and 200
breaststroke: 50, 100 and 200
butterfly: 50, 100 and 200
individual medley (I.M.): 100 (25m only), 200 and 400
relays (national): 4 × 50 free (25m only), 4 × 100 free, 4 × 200 free, 4 × 50 medley (25m only), 4 × 100 medley
relays (club teams): 4 × 50 free, 4 × 100 free, 4 × 200 free, 4 × 100 back, 4 × 200 back, 4 × 100 breast, 4 × 200 breast, 4 × 100 fly, 4 × 200 fly, 4 × 50 medley, and 4 × 100 medley

Long Course (50 m)

Men

Women

Mixed relay

Short Course (25 m)

Men

Women

Mixed relay

References

External links
Swiss Swimming Federation
Swiss Records swimrankings.net 17 December 2022 updated

Swiss
Records
Swimming
Swimming